Straže is a small settlement in the Slovene Hills in the Municipality of Lenart in northeastern Slovenia. The area is part of the traditional region of Styria. It is now included in the Drava Statistical Region.

A 6 m plague column in the settlement dates to 1712.

References

External links
Straže on Geopedia

Populated places in the Municipality of Lenart